Cresta di Enghe is a mountain of the Veneto, Italy. It has an elevation of 2,414 metres.

Mountains of the Alps
Mountains of Veneto